Steven Nicholas Swart (born 8 February 1959) is a South African politician, and member of Parliament for the African Christian Democratic Party.

Following a prayer breakfast in Bloemfontein in March 2020 he was one of 67 attendees infected with COVID-19, but recovered since.

References

External links
 

1959 births
Living people
African Christian Democratic Party politicians
Members of the National Assembly of South Africa